, later also known only as , is a fictional character of the Japanese manga series JoJo's Bizarre Adventure written and illustrated by Hirohiko Araki and the main antagonist of the series (and the character with the greatest impact in the entire series). He is featured initially as the main antagonist of the series' first part, Phantom Blood and later returns as the main antagonist of the series' third part, Stardust Crusaders, now solely known as DIO. In the alternate universe of the series' seventh part, Steel Ball Run, a character named  bears resemblance to Dio and appears as a major antagonist.

The poor son of Dario Brando, an abusive alcoholic who worked Dio's mother to death, Dio was originally a young British with enormous enmity towards others who, due to the power of an ancient stone mask, becomes a powerful immortal vampire. After the events of the first part, he reappears a 100 years later in the third part now as user of the time-stopping Stand named The World. As the series' most prolific villain, his defining trait is his staunch ambition, which manifests in a peerless desire for power, no matter the cost.

Creation and design
When beginning the series, Dio was the character that Araki looked forward to drawing the most. He also revealed that he had not thought up a weakness for the character and that it was difficult to come up with a way for Dio to be defeated. In regard to Dio's characterization, Araki said that he was inspired by FBI profiling of serial killers, admitting that in a way he thinks they must be incredibly strong to be able to commit the heinous crimes that they do. How serial killers control their victims through psychological manipulation interested Araki as well, a trait similar to how Dio uses his charisma to ensure his followers to do his bidding. Araki intended to characterize Dio as unapologetically baleful in his pursuit of power, with his literal abandonment of his humanity reflecting his figurative and emotional one. Araki wanted his name to sound cool next to JoJo's, so he chose Dio, the Italian word for God.

According to Araki, Dio's physical appearance is inspired by Rutger Hauer's character Roy Batty from the 1982 film Blade Runner.

Dio is canonically bisexual. Araki stated in a 2007 interview that "[Dio's] sort of a composed character that could go either way. [He] could go with a man or a woman."

Appearances

Phantom Blood
In Phantom Blood, the child of an abusive drunkard named Dario Brando, Dio Brando becomes the adopted brother of Jonathan Joestar by using the promise that George Joestar made to Dario years ago. Upon entering the Joestar estate after his father died, Dio wasted no time unequivocally making young Jonathan's life a living hell to take everything from him including abusing and later killing Jonathan's dog, Danny. Dio underestimated Jonathan's retaliation for forcefully kissing his beloved Erina Pendleton, spending the next seven years feigning to be Jonathan's friend before enacting his plan to steal the Joestar fortune by poisoning George with the same poison he used to kill Dario. When Jonathan investigates the matter for proof, Dio plots to use an ancient Aztec stone mask to murder Jonathan.

However, Dio learns the mask transforms the wearer into a vampire when exposed to blood, and uses it on himself when his scheme is exposed. Although seemingly killed when Jonathan impales him on a stone statue and leaves him in the burning Joestar mansion, Dio survives, and proceeds to start his subjugation of England in the small village of Windknight's Lot, amassing sired followers to his cause. Jonathan is sought out by Will A. Zeppeli, a master of an ancient martial art called Hamon, which can kill Vampires. He teaches Jonathan how to use this ability as Dio sends other vampires and zombies in his pursuit to kill him so he can take over the world.

Jonathan seemingly defeats him once more, but Dio's decapitated head survives. With the help of his servant, Wang Chan, Dio attacks Jonathan on a steam liner during his honeymoon with Erina in an attempt to claim his enemy's body for his own. Despite having his throat fatally punctured by Dio, Jonathan is able to use Hamon one last time to overload the ship's engines, with Dio apparently destroyed in the resulting explosion. Erina, escaping unharmed with an orphaned girl, survives with their unborn son.

Battle Tendency
As he is dormant in the sunken ship, Dio Brando does not appear in Battle Tendency, but the aftermath of his apparent death at the hands of Jonathan Joestar affects the plot. It is ultimately revealed that Jonathan and Erina's son George Joestar II, a famed pilot of the Royal Air Force in World War I, was murdered by one of Dio's zombie henchmen who survived the battle at Windknight's Lot and had infiltrated the RAF. George II's wife, the orphaned girl Elizabeth, hunted down this zombie and killed him with her Hamon. However, as no-one else recognized the zombie's true identity, she became a wanted murderer and was forced into hiding as Lisa Lisa with the help of the Speedwagon Foundation that was founded by Robert E. O. Speedwagon. Lisa Lisa would later encounter her son Joseph Joestar, teaching him Hamon so he can defeat the Pillar Man, Kars, whose creation of the Stone masks made him indirectly responsible for Dio's transformation.

Stardust Crusaders
It is revealed in Stardust Crusaders that Dio survived the ship's explosion by decapitating Jonathan's head corpse and attaching his own head to it as the ship sank, he confined himself inside a casket at the bottom of the ocean for a century until a shipwreck salvage operation unintentionally retrieved him in 1983. Now known mononymously as "DIO", he soon meets the mystic Enya Geil who awakens both of his Stands, allowing him to stop the passage of time around him, and a Hermit Purple-like stand (technically Jonathan's Stand; one person could only have one Stand. Since Dio is using Jonathan's body, he could awaken and use Jonathan's Stand). As his head is attached to Jonathan's body, Dio's acquisition of The World also awakens Stand abilities in all of Jonathan's living descendants. While Joseph Joestar and his grandson Jotaro Kujo have the resolve to control their Stands, Joseph's daughter and Jotaro's mother Holly has her very life sapped away by her own Stand because of her gentle disposition. This spurs Jotaro and Joseph to track down Dio along with their friends Mohammed Avdol, Noriaki Kakyoin, Jean-Pierre Polnareff, and Iggy the Boston Terrier to kill him once and for all, freeing Holly from the curse the Stand has trapped her under.

Dio responds by sending other Stand users to assassinate the Joestars before they can find him in his mansion lair in Cairo, some of whom (namely Kakyoin and Polnareff) he had previously mind controlled and joined the Joestars on their journey after being saved by them. Along the way, Avdol and Iggy are killed by Dio's right-hand man Vanilla Ice, who in turn is killed by Polnareff. Dio kills Jotaro's friend Kakyoin in combat and then kills Joseph in front of Jotaro. During his battle with Jotaro, Dio is severely hurt and resorts to draining Joseph of his blood, not only healing himself but also finally completing his unification with Jonathan's body. Dio greatly strengthens his vampiric abilities and his Stand, but Jotaro's Stand, Star Platinum, proves to be The World's equally powered counterpart. After much effort, fuelled by the rage of his friends and grandfather’s deaths as well as his mother's dwindling health, by taking advantage of Dio's pride and desire to test his strengthened abilities, Jotaro finally manages to awaken his own time-stopping powers and overpower Dio with Star Platinum, successfully killing him.

Jotaro and the Speedwagon Foundation doctors revives Joseph via blood transfusion from Dio/Jonathan's corpse. Then Joseph and Jotaro take their ancestor's corpse out into the desert and expose it to sunlight, which disintegrates due to the vampiric infection, vanquishing Dio once and for all and allowing Jonathan to finally rest in peace after many years.

Diamond Is Unbreakable and Golden Wind
Dio is not present in either Diamond Is Unbreakable or Golden Wind, but his influence on the story is still present. In Diamond Is Unbreakable, it is revealed that Dio acquired his Stand by means of an ancient artifact known as the "Bow and Arrow", which has reappeared in the fictional Japanese town of Morioh because the children of one of Dio's former lackeys, Mr. Nijimura, are seeking out someone who can possibly kill their father and put him out his misery due to the strange mutation he has suffered as a result of Dio's death. In Golden Wind, the protagonist Giorno Giovanna is Dio's son, but because Dio was in possession of Jonathan's body at the time of Giorno's conception, Giorno is biologically Jonathan's son and thus a member of the Joestar family, and his own virtuous soul prevents him from becoming evil as Dio was, thanks to his encounter with a heroic gangster in his childhood life.

Stone Ocean
Dio's influence on JoJo's Bizarre Adventure returns in Stone Ocean, where it is revealed that he met the story arc's main antagonist, Father Enrico Pucci, shortly before the events of Stardust Crusaders. He told Father Pucci of his desire to use his Stand, The World in order to reach "Heaven", and saw in the young priest a friendship that would help him achieve his goals. Father Pucci's reverence for Dio drives him to carry out his plans decades later, manipulating events to frame Jotaro Kujo's daughter Jolyne Cujoh for murder in order to trap her in the prison where he serves as a chaplain, using the final physical remains of Dio to evolve his Stand to reset reality in what he believes is Dio's vision of Heaven, a world where everyone knows their own destiny, and more importantly a world free of the Joestar bloodline. However, his hubris leads to his defeat at the hands of Jolyne's last surviving friend Emporio, who manages to reset reality back to what it once was, but not quite exactly the way it was before, as, in this new version of the world, Pucci is missing instead of the Joestars. Stone Ocean also introduces Dio's three other children: Ungalo, Rikiel, and Donatello Versus.

Steel Ball Run
Dio Brando himself does not appear in Steel Ball Run, set in an alternate universe in 1890, and is replaced by Diego Brando. Like Dio, Diego is the child of an abusive household, and one who reveres his mother. She instilled in him a sense of pride that he took with him as he became a masterful jockey in his adulthood. When he decides to take part in the Steel Ball Run horse race across the United States, he winds up under the thrall of the Stand Scary Monsters , transforming him into a dromaeosaurid dinosaur. As a result of this encounter, however, he gains his own Stand Scary Monsters, which grants him the same abilities that he now has under his control.

Diego is hired by United States President Funny Valentine in his quest to seek out the pieces of the Saint's Corpse scattered along the racecourse, but after some time fighting against the heroes Johnny Joestar and Gyro Zeppeli, he realizes that President Valentine's plans are more dangerous to the world as a whole and joins the heroes in an attempt to stop him, only to die during his quest as well.

Valentine then uses his Stand's powers to summon a Diego Brando from an alternate universe. This Diego possesses the same stand powers as the original Dio Brando, due to having his own version of The World as a Stand. He manages to defeat Johnny Joestar in battle and wins the Steel Ball Run, in addition to obtaining all of the Saint's Corpse and hiding it in a secure location, even though President Valentine has already been killed by Johnny in a fight. However, in this alternate universe Diego meets his demise at the hands of Lucy Steel, who uses the skull of this universe's Diego Brando to obliterate his own head as a result of the effects of Valentine's Stand.

The original Dio appears as a cameo in a volume-exclusive interlude detailing the mechanics and limitations of Stand abilities.

JoJolion
Dio makes a brief cameo appearance during the events of "The Wonder of You (The Miracle of Your Love)" arc, along with the Stone Mask.

Abilities
Above all else, Dio Brando is known for his cunning and careful consideration. It is when Jonathan Joestar defies his expectations, defeating him in battle and thwarting his deliberate machinations, that Dio dons the Stone Mask that grants him the power of a vampire. He attains superhuman speed, regeneration fueled by sucking blood through his fingers, and strength insofar as he can lift a road roller with ease - a frequent source of references in popular culture.

As a vampire, he most frequently uses an exaggerated evaporated cooling form of freezing known simply as the  that allows him to freeze his opponents while rendering direct attacks with Hamon useless. While powerful, it does not kill people instantly (seen at the end of Phantom Blood, a victim of the attack survives - although he died shortly after.) Another vampiric technique available to Dio is  that allows him to shoot two pressurised fluid jets from his eyes. He can also graft body parts of different beings together, an ability he then used to take Jonathan Joestar's body as his own.

Once he returns 100 years later with Jonathan's body, Dio developed his signature Stand, The World, after being struck by the Bow and Arrow. As a psychic manifestation of Dio, it has all of his aforementioned superhuman abilities and facilitates melee attacks, though its signature ability is to stop time. This time-stopping ability only lasts for a limited amount of time (which in the anime adaptation of Stardust Crusaders is heavily exaggerated), though this limit can be extended through practice or through other means of increasing the user's strength (such as when Dio was able to increase his limit by several seconds after drinking Joseph Joestar's blood). In addition, Dio gained access to a second stand through the use of Jonathan's body; this unnamed stand bears a resemblance to Hermit Purple of Joseph Joestar, and has the ability of divination.

Steel Ball Run
Dio's Part 7 counterpart, Diego Brando, first encounters Scary Monsters when he comes into conflict with its original user Dr. Ferdinand, Ferdinand "infects" Diego, as well as an entire village, transforming them into dinosaurs. After gaining the Left Eye Corpse Part, Diego gains his own version of Scary Monsters that allows him to transform himself or others (including his horse Silver Bullet) into dinosaur versions of themselves, partially or entirely. Scary Monsters grants Diego increased strength, speed, healing, and "dynamic vision". Dynamic vision provides Diego with excellent eyesight however he can only see objects which are moving, similar to that of the Tyrannosaurus Rex in Jurassic Park.

After Diego's death by the hands of Funny Valentine, Valentine summons a Diego from an alternate universe. This Diego possesses The World like Part 3's Dio, and can also stop time. The design of Diego's The World is very similar to that of Part 3, apart from its skinnier profile and the replacement of the hearts on The World's knees for capital Ds.

Voice actors
Dio has had many different voice actors in different types of media. He was first voiced by Norio Wakamoto in the 1992 drama CDs, followed by Nobuo Tanaka in the OVAs and Isshin Chiba in the 1998 video game. He is voiced by both Kenji Nojima and Hikaru Midorikawa in the Phantom Blood video game and 2007 animated film as the younger and older incarnations, respectively. In the 2012 television anime and in all subsequent media, he is voiced by Takehito Koyasu.

Dio has only ever had two English voice actors; he was voiced by Kid Beyond in the OVAs, and by Patrick Seitz in the TV anime.

In other media
Dio Brando has appeared in many video games related to the JoJo's Bizarre Adventure franchise, usually as a player character or a boss. Some games include multiple versions of the character; in JoJo's Bizarre Adventure: Eyes of Heaven for example, both Dio Brando from Part 1 and DIO from Part 3 are playable characters, along with Diego Brando and Parallel World Diego from Part 7. Furthermore, he has appeared as a playable character in several crossover video games, such as Jump Super Stars, Jump Ultimate Stars, and Jump Force.

 is the main antagonist in the story mode of JoJo's Bizarre Adventure: Eyes of Heaven, being a version of Dio from an alternate universe where he killed the Joestar Group in the 80s and eventually executed his vision of "obtaining heaven" by sacrificing 36 evil souls and subjugates his world with the reality-writing power of his evolved Stand . Dio would learn of alternate realities from Funny Valentine, seeking to control all universes through the Saint's Corpse, and uses his more advanced powers over time to revive fallen heroes and villains to serve him in preventing Jotaro Kujo and the other Joestars from obtaining all of the Saint's Corpse, or at least using them to gather the parts so he can steal them from them and achieve his ultimate power.

Reception
Dio has generally received praise from various reviewers of manga, anime, and other media; most praised his frightening and enjoyably evil personality making an appealing antagonist, as well as his influence on the rest of the series. Rebecca Silverman of Anime News Network notes that his far-reaching influence throughout the entire series works especially well as a stark contrast to his humble origins. Her colleague Jacob Chapman called him "one of the greatest supervillains ever invented in any medium." Can Hoang Tran of The News Hub cites the anticipation of Dio's appearance in the 2014 reanimation of Stardust Crusaders to be a driving force of the series' success, later calling him the most rewarding character to play as in the series' video games. Joel Loynds of The Linc wrote "Dio's actions so powerfully and immediately establish his evil... that you will be invested in seeing his evolution even more than you [will be for JoJo]". Dallas Marshall of Green Tea Graffiti writes that Araki's straightforward intention of making the reader hate Dio worked simply and flawlessly, citing Dio's defining character moment as burning the protagonist's dog alive. Jun Yamamoto for Billboard said he "could almost feel the passion and ambition that Jonathan Joestar had in his fight against Dio" when listening to the first opening of the TV series.

Readers of Anime News Network voted Dio number one in a poll of which anime villains would make the best friends in real life for his "cool composure" and "awesome lines".

In February 2013, a life-size statue of Dio was displayed at Wonder Festival to promote the event. Starting in June 2014, Dio began appearing on cans of Japanese best-selling java Georgia coffee, as part of a special promotion of their Emerald Mountain Black flavor. An attraction in Cinema 4-D based on the fight between Dio and Jotaro Kujo had been created by Universal Studios Japan.

Several characters in Japanese anime, manga, and video games draw inspiration from Dio. One such example is Sakuya Izayoi from the Touhou Project.

References

Adoptee characters in anime and manga
Anime and manga characters who can move at superhuman speeds
Anime and manga characters with accelerated healing
Anime and manga characters with superhuman strength
Anime and manga supervillains
Comics characters introduced in 1987
Fictional bisexual males
Fictional British people
Fictional characters who can manipulate time
Fictional characters with evocation or summoning abilities
Fictional characters with immortality
Fictional characters with superhuman durability or invulnerability
Fictional characters with superhuman senses
Fictional hypnotists and indoctrinators
Fictional mass murderers
Fictional murdered people
Fictional patricides
Fictional vampires
JoJo's Bizarre Adventure
LGBT characters in anime and manga
Male characters in anime and manga
Narcissism in fiction
Villains in animated television series